IRO, Iro, or iro may refer to:

Organizations
 Institution of Railway Operators (Chartered Institution of Railway Operators since October 2021)
 Internal Revolutionary Organization, Bulgaria
 International Refugee Organization, a United Nations agency 1946–1952
 International Rescue Dog Organisation 
 Jewish Industrial Removal Office, an agency assisting European Jewish immigrants to the U.S. in the early 20th century

People

Given name
 Iro Haarla (born 1956), Finnish jazz musician
 Iro Ilk, German Luftwaffe pilot; recipient of the Knight's Cross of the Iron Cross
 Iro Konstantopoulou (1927–1944), Greek resistance member during World War II
 Iro Tembeck (1946–2004), Canadian dancer, choreographer, and dance historian

Surname
 Andy Iro (born 1984), English footballer
 Edgar Iro (born 2000), Solomon Islands swimmer
 Hapilyn Iro (born 1992), Solomon Islands weightlifter
 Kayal Iro (born 2000), Cook Islands rugby league footballer
 Kevin Iro (born 1968), New Zealand rugby league footballer
 Tony Iro (born 1967), New Zealand rugby league footballer and coach

Places
 Iro (South Sudan), a mountain
 Iro Lake, Chad
 Iro town in Obafemi Owode, Nigeria

Other uses
 Birao Airport (IATA code)
 Inland Revenue Ordinance, a tax law in Hong Kong
 Japanese oiler Irō, an Imperial Japanese Navy fleet oiler 1922–1944
 Mohawk hairstyle or iro

See also
 Iroh, a fictional character in Avatar: The Last Airbender
 Lac Iro (disambiguation)